Protected areas in Estonia are national parks, nature reserves and landscape protection areas (nature parks).

Estonia has five national parks, 167 nature reserves and 152 landscape conservation areas. In addition, there are 116 (118) protected areas with an old (Soviet-era) protection regulation and 537 parks.  In total, 18.1% of Estonia are protected nature areas, with Lääne County having the highest percentage (32%) and Põlva County the lowest percentage of protected areas, about 9%.

National parks

Nature reserves

Landscape conservation areas

See also
 Protected areas of Estonia
 List of Ramsar sites in Estonia
 Estonian Nature Fund
 :Category:Nature conservation in Estonia

Notes

References

External links
 EELIS: Estonian Nature Information System
 Estonian Environmental Registry
 List of Estonian protected areas in the World Database on Protected Areas
 Important bird areas of Estonia (BirdLife International)

Nature reserves
Estonia
 
Protected areas